Normanville is a coastal town in the Australian state of South Australia on the west coast of the Fleurieu Peninsula.

Location and geography
It is the largest regional centre on the western side of the Fleurieu Peninsula. It is situated next to the mouth of the Bungala River.

The Yankalilla River has its mouth just south of the town, at Lady Bay.

History
The town was established by South Australia's first dentist, Robert Norman, in 1849. General houses for people were built first, followed by the general store, and the hotel. This was quickly followed by the local Government House, which housed the Police Officer, court house, and jail cells. Norman opened the Normanville Hotel in 1851 and a church soon after. The Normanville Hotel became the host of the first district council meeting for the area. The town eventually grew to become a successful wheat exporting area, using the nearby jetty at the current Normanville Beach as a port for ships coming and going. However, with the development of Adelaide as the capital city, it lost its prior importance.

Heritage listings
Normanville includes the following sites listed on the South Australian Heritage Register:
 18 Main South Road: Normanville Wesleyan Cemetery
 Little Gorge Beach, Main South Road: Dickson Beach House
 Williss Drive: Ferguson's Flour Mill
Normanville Coastal Dunes

Economy
Normanville's economy is primarily based on and driven by tourism, although primary production is still active in the area. The Normanville Beach, jetty, historic buildings and the Normanville Hotel are the main focal points for visitors. Normanville is situated in the Southern Fleurieu wine region.

Media
Normanville has a radio station – Radio 876 – which plays a mixture of Country, Easy-Listening and Nostalgia 24 hours a day.

See also
Normanville (disambiguation)
Lady Bay, South Australia

References

Further reading
Straiton, P. 2015 1,2,3,4, I Believe I Thought I Saw: Preliminary Examination of Normanville Beach. Master Thesis, Department of Archaeology, Flinders University, Adelaide.

Towns in South Australia
Fleurieu Peninsula
Gulf St Vincent